Boston Spa is a civil parish in the metropolitan borough of the City of Leeds, West Yorkshire, England.  The parish contains 58 listed buildings that are recorded in the National Heritage List for England. All the listed buildings are designated at Grade II, the lowest of the three grades, which is applied to "buildings of national importance and special interest".  The parish contains the village of Boston Spa and the surrounding area.  The spa was discovered in 1744 and during the late 18th and early 19th century the village developed as a spa town.  This resulted in the building of hotels and many substantial houses, mainly along the High Street or nearby.  Most of these are built in magnesian limestone with roofs of stone slate or Welsh slate, and are in Georgian style, and many of them are listed.  Also listed are the hotels and the original baths, which have been converted for domestic and other uses.  The other listed buildings include structures associated with these houses, the former lodge to Wetherby Grange, a road bridge, a public house, two churches, and two mileposts.


Buildings

References

Citations

Sources

 

Lists of listed buildings in West Yorkshire